Pulling a stroke is a phrase used in Ireland to describe an act of deceit performed for personal gain. Elsewhere similar practices are referred to as "pulling a fast one". Successfully pulling a stroke is often seen in a positive light and stroke pullers are often commended or thought of highly, even if the act involves illegal activities or serious rule-bending, and are sometimes seen as loveable rogues.

In popular culture
 In the Winter of 2010 Irish-language broadcaster TG4 ran a 5-part series entitled "Stróc" (Stroke, in English) looking at notable strokes and stroke pullers in recent Irish history. Although strokes are usually seen to be performed exclusively by Irish people, the Irish National Football Team's 2010 World Cup Qualification came undone as a direct result of a stroke, in this case pulled by Thierry Henry. The French scored the winning goal after Henry deliberately hand-balled in the build-up. Ironically the entire Irish nation was affected by (literally) a stroke of hand.
 In the BBC sitcom Only Fools and Horses episode titled The Miracle of Peckham, the characters Rodney Trotter and Uncle Albert discuss why Rodney's brother Del Trotter has gone to church.
Rodney ponders:
"Last night he was talking about God, this morning he went to church, this afternoon he's seen a miracle, it can only mean one thing..."

To which Albert replies:
"He's caught religion!"

To which Rodney replies:
''"No, he's pulling a stroke, in'he?"

See also
 Confidence tricksters

References

External links
TG4 Stróc series

English phrases